The canton of Huriel is an administrative division in central France. At the French canton reorganisation which came into effect in March 2015, the canton was expanded from 14 to 31 communes (3 of which merged into the new commune Haut-Bocage):
 
Archignat
Audes
Bizeneuille
Le Brethon
Chambérat
La Chapelaude
Chazemais
Cosne-d'Allier
Courçais
Estivareilles
Haut-Bocage
Hérisson
Huriel
Louroux-Bourbonnais
Mesples
Nassigny
Reugny
Saint-Caprais
Saint-Désiré
Saint-Éloy-d'Allier
Saint-Martinien
Saint-Palais
Saint-Sauvier
Sauvagny
Tortezais
Treignat
Vallon-en-Sully
Venas
Viplaix

Demographics

See also
Cantons of the Allier department 
Communes of France

References

Cantons of Allier